Joe Mpisi (born 12 November 1966) is a South African politician and former trade unionist who has represented the African National Congress (ANC) in the Gauteng Provincial Legislature since 2014. He has served as the Provincial Chairperson of the Gauteng branch of the South African Communist Party (SACP) since 2012.

Early life and career 
Mpisi was born on 12 November 1966 in Meadowlands, Soweto in present-day Gauteng. He matriculated at Lamola Jubilee Senior Secondary School, where he became involved in anti-apartheid politics, including through the United Democratic Front. According to Mpisi, in 1980 he joined the ANC and its close ally the SACP.

After the end of apartheid, he was active in the National Education, Health and Allied Workers' Union, an affiliate of the Congress of South African Trade Unions, where he served as a shop steward and ultimately as Deputy President. He also remained active in the SACP: in March 2012, at the Gauteng SACP's tenth provincial congress in Benoni, he was elected unopposed as SACP Provincial Chairperson; he served under Provincial Secretary Jacob Mamabolo, with Rosemary Thobejane-Ndoqo as his deputy.

Legislative career 
Two years after his election to the SACP chair, Mpisi was elected to the Gauteng Provincial Legislature in the 2014 general election, ranked 37th on the ANC's provincial party list. During the legislative term that followed, he was re-elected unopposed to his SACP office in May 2015 and May 2018. In 2017, he called for South African President Jacob Zuma to resign over allegations that his administration had facilitated state capture by the Gupta family. 

Mpisi was re-elected to his legislative seat in the 2019 general election, ranked 31st on the ANC's party list.

Personal life 
He is married and has four children, three sons and a daughter. He is a member of Change Bible Church in Katlehong.

References

External links 

 

African National Congress politicians
Living people
Year of birth missing (living people)
Members of the Gauteng Provincial Legislature
21st-century South African politicians